Kirk Iverson is an American inventor, writer, producer, media executive, investor and financier who invented the Veterans Media Center Free Enterprise Zone (VMC2) and VMC2 Banking Consortium architecture, the world’s first integrated, media-specific free enterprise zone and media-specific free enterprise zone financing model.

Career
Iverson spent a decade working from intern at Baltimore Pictures, Barry Levinson's production company at Warner Bros. Studios and 1492 Pictures, Chris Columbus' production company at 20th Century Fox to global head of creative development and production at Wieden+Kennedy advertising agency, focusing on its entertainment projects: Ginga, Battlegrounds, Sportsblender, The Sims Show, Nothing but the Truth, Kobe’s Disciples and Coraline feature film marketing. He has worked for unit production manager Sharon Mann on Steven Spielberg’s Minority Report, producer Colin Wilson on Terminator 3: Rise of the Machines and Dan Wieden, co-founder and CEO of Wieden+Kennedy.  He assisted Phil Knight (co-founder and chairman of Nike Inc. and chairman and owner of LAIKA) in designing the marketing strategy and building the marketing team for LAIKA’s Coraline distributed by Focus Features, securing Wieden+Kennedy’s first feature film marketing campaign with a major studio distributor.

Iverson brought CliffsNotes Films and Search for the Ultimate Athlete into Wieden+Kennedy as co-productions, and after leaving Wieden+Kennedy, was hired by the series’ copyright holders to executive produce, write and creative direct both series. A third party production company and studio then optioned the series, respectively.

Iverson has worked with Nike, Electronic Arts, Warner Brothers, 20th Century Fox, Endgame Entertainment, Procter & Gamble, Nokia, Walt Disney Pictures, Target, Google, YouTube, LAIKA, Coca-Cola, MTV, Wasserman Media Group, Echo Lake Entertainment, Gigapix Studios, PBS, DEVO and IMAX.

Globalcraft
In an effort to decrease budgetary waste and investor risk without hurting creative quality, Iverson founded Globalcraft in 2009, run by leading creatives and strategists from Fortune 500 entertainment and marketing backgrounds. Globalcraft uses proprietary quantitative analysis to assess the financial viability of media investments in addition to providing development, finance, production, marketing and distribution services.

Holdings
Iverson is the majority owner of Globalcraft.

In 2011, Iverson invented The Cloud Studio Model, a privately held joint venture for top producers, brands, financiers and distributors to achieve greater cost savings, creative protection and investor protection compared to status quo studio models. Globalcraft is the majority owner of the Cloud Studio Model.

In 2011, Iverson (Globalcraft) partnered with Tim Lawrence (Digital Works Productions) to lobby the City of Portland and the State of Oregon to convert the Veterans Memorial Coliseum in Portland, Oregon into an integrated production (recording and interactive) soundstage, exhibition venue, free enterprise zone and free enterprise zone banking consortium. Cornilles and Lawrence designed and led the soundstage portion of the initiative while Iverson designed and led the financing architecture for the soundstage, free enterprise zone and banking consortium. They proposed that the project be named Veterans Media Center (VMC2). VMC2 would be the largest integrated production space under one roof in the world.

Training
Iverson studied story under the instruction of DreamWorks SKG story analyst Mitchell Levin.

Iverson studied the Meisner Technique for two years under the instruction of Laurel Smith, a direct disciple of Sanford Meisner.

Iverson worked as a 2nd Assistant Camera person and camera (film) loader on feature films.

Iverson was mentored in strategic finance and investment banking by Benjamin Dickey (Madison Advisors) and Andrew Kline (Park Lane Investment Bank).

Personal life
Iverson was born and raised in Portland, Oregon. After raising the money to serve as a volunteer public health worker on rabies vaccination, dental hygiene, reforestation and public sanitation projects in Ecuador and Honduras with Amigos de Las Americas during high school, he graduated Phi Beta Kappa from Beloit College in 1999. He speaks fluent Spanish.

References

External links
 Iverson's Filmography on Internet Movie Database (IMDB)
 Globalcraft Media+Studios

American inventors
Living people
Writers from Portland, Oregon
Wieden+Kennedy people
Beloit College alumni
Year of birth missing (living people)